Potamophylax coronavirus is a species of caddisfly in the family Limnephilidae. It is endemic to Kosovo. It was named after the COVID-19 pandemic.

Description

The male's head and appendages are brown, with the prothorax, sclerites of mesothorax, metathorax and coxae dark brown to black, femora and tibiae brown, and the tarsi gradually darkening to the apex.

The only known female resembles P. juliani and is lighter-coloured. Its head and appendages are brown, as well as the femora and tibiae, the prothorax, sclerites of mesothorax and metathorax light brown to brown, and the tarsi gradually darkening. The forewings, 8.5 mm long, are light brown and shorter than the abdomen, with very long setae. The genitalia remain undescribed, because the female has a slightly damaged terminalia.

Habitat
The river has been severed in recent years, due to the construction of a hydropower plant. The river basin habitat of P. coronavirus has been described as a "battlefield between scientists and civil society on one side and the management of the hydropower plant operating on this river on the other."

Taxonomy 
It was described by a team of researchers, led by Halil Ibrahimi of the University of Pristina. The species belongs to the Potamophylax winneguthi species group and is morphologically similar to P. juliani and P. winneguthi. The type specimens were collected in 2014 a few years prior to description.

Etymology 
The specific name coronavirus refers to the COVID-19 pandemic. The author states that he also named this species in this manner to raise awareness towards environmental pollution in Kosovo and the Balkan countries which he quotes as a "silent pandemic on freshwater organisms in Kosovo rivers". It is the second organism to be named after the pandemic, following the curculionoid beetle (weevil) Stethantyx covida.

References

See also 
 List of species named after the COVID-19 pandemic

External links

 
 

Limnephilidae
Insects of Europe
Insects described in 2021